Le Marin (or ) is a town and commune in the French overseas department of Martinique.

Population

Points of interest
In Le Marin there is Église du Marin, an old church built in 1766. It contains a marble altar and some figurettes worth seeing.

See also
Communes of Martinique

References

External links

Communes of Martinique
Subprefectures in France
Populated places in Martinique